Kentucky Space is a non-profit consortium of private and public universities, companies, and other organizations with the goal of designing and leading innovative space missions within realistic budgets and objectives. The enterprise is supported by the Kentucky Space Grant Consortium and developed out of the programs of the Kentucky Science and Technology Corporation.

Consortium

 Kentucky Science and Technology Corporation
 Kentucky Council on Postsecondary Education
 Kentucky Science and Engineering Foundation
 Kentucky Space Grant Consortium
 Belcan
 Morehead State University
 Murray State University
 University of Kentucky - Space Systems Laboratory
 University of Louisville
 Western Kentucky University
 Kentucky Community and Technical College System

Partners

 NASA Ames Research Center
 Kentucky Virtual Campus

Projects

 KySat-1, a CubeSat designed by Kentucky Space which defines a standard reusable bus and was intended to be used as part of a program intended to interest and involve school children in science. It was lost during a failure of the Taurus XL rocket during launch on March 4, 2011.
 Space Express 1, a suborbital solid-fuel rocket payload launched in 2007 from White Sands Missile Range.
 Balloon-1, a high-altitude balloon payload launched from Bowling Green, Kentucky on July 14, 2008.
 Space Express 2, an inertial measurement unit payload designed for a Garvey Spacecraft Corporation rocket.
 KySat-2, a CubeSat re-designed by Kentucky Space to fulfil the original mission of KySat-1. It was successfully launched and activated on November 19, 2013 aboard a Minotaur I

Asteroid mining

On August 4–6, 2008 a group of space professionals, entrepreneurs, venture capitalists and mining engineers gathered in Pleasant Hill, Kentucky to discuss the development of an asteroid resource development business strategy.  The discussion ranged from space technology, propulsion, and orbital mechanics to space law, markets, value proposition and financial plans.

See also

 List of space agencies

References

External links
 Official Site for Kentucky Space
 Official KSGC website
 Kentucky Science and Technology Corporation
 Space Systems Laboratory (University of Kentucky)



Non-profit organizations based in Kentucky
Space program of the United States